Der Landmann ('The Farmer') was a German-language weekly newspaper. It was initially published from Omsk in 1924, but later moved to Novosibirsk after its 28 May 1925 issue. Löffler served as the editor of Der Landmann. Der Landmann was closed down in 1930.

References

German-language communist newspapers
Newspapers published in the Soviet Union
German-language newspapers published in Asia